Eli Alon (born 1945 in Tel Aviv) is an anesthesiologist who specialises in pain therapy.

Biography 
Eli Alon holds a Medical degree from the University of Milan since 1972. He completed his residency in anesthesiology at the University of Milan and the University Hospital Zurich and a clinical research fellowship at the University of California, San Francisco.

He was a physician in military service in Israel and chairman of anesthesiology at Ospedale Regionale di Lugano where he founded the first school for nurse anesthetists and he was the first president of the anesthesiologists in the Canton Ticino.

Since 1991 he is chief of an interdisciplinary pain clinic in Zurich and consultant in pain management at the University Hospital Zurich.

Alon's fields of research and investigation are obstetric anesthesia, patient-controlled analgesia, regional anesthesia, and chronic pain management. He was President of the Swiss Pain Society SPS 2005-2008 and Board Member 1999–2011, where he is still chairing the yearly advanced training course in pain management. He was Editor of the European Journal of Pain, Acta Anaesthesiologica Helvetica, International Monitor of Regional Anesthesia, Obstetric Anesthesia Digest and Der Schmerz.

Eli Alon lives in Zurich, Switzerland. He is married, has two children and four grandchildren.

Awards and honors 
 Honorary member of the Swiss Pain Society SPS
Dr. Margrit Egnér Foundation Award 2015

Publications 
Alon is the author of 10 books and Proceedings, over 80 original articles and 45 book chapters. 
 Anästhesie und Schmerzlinderung in der Geburtshilfe 
 Practical aspects of pain management 
 Lectures during the joint annual congress... 
 Chronic pain-pharmacological and interventional therapy
 Clinical aspects of pain management
 Erfolgreiches Management von Schmerzpatienten

External links 
 
 Abschiedssymposium für Eli Alon at Webseite der Schweizerischen Gesellschaft zum Studium des Schmerzes
 www.sip-platform.eu/switzerland.html
 https://swisspainsociety.ch/en/
 https://europeanpainfederation.eu

Israeli anesthesiologists
1945 births
Living people